Ochroma pyramidale, commonly known as the balsa tree, is a large, fast-growing tree native to the Americas. It is the sole member of the genus Ochroma. The tree is famous for its wide usage in woodworking, with the name balsa being the Spanish word for "raft."

A deciduous angiosperm, Ochroma pyramidale can grow up to 30 m tall, and is classified as a hardwood despite the wood itself being very soft; it is the softest commercial hardwood and is widely used because of its light weight.

Biology 

A member of the mallow family, Ochroma pyramidale is native from southern Mexico to southern Brazil, but can now be found in many other countries (Papua New Guinea, Indonesia, Thailand, Solomon Islands). It is a pioneer plant, which establishes itself in clearings in forests, either man-made or where trees have fallen, or in abandoned agricultural fields. The speed of growth accounts for the lightness of the wood, which has a lower density than cork. Trees generally do not live beyond 30 to 40 years.

Flowers are produced from the third year onwards, typically at the end of the rainy season when few other trees are in flower. The large flowers open in the late afternoon and remain open overnight. Daytime pollinators include capuchin monkeys. However, most pollination occurs at night. The main pollinators were once thought to be bats, but recent evidence suggests that two nocturnal arboreal mammals, the kinkajou and the olingo, may be the primary pollinators.

It is evergreen or dry-season deciduous, with large , weakly palmately lobed leaves.

Being a deciduous angiosperm, balsa is classified as a hardwood despite the wood itself being very soft; it is the softest commercial hardwood.

Cultivation 

Ecuador supplies 95% or more of commercial balsa. In recent years, about 60% of the balsa has been plantation-grown in densely packed patches of around 1000 trees per hectare (compared to about two to three per hectare in nature).  The trees are harvested after six to ten years of growth.

Uses 

Balsa lumber is very soft and light, with a coarse, open grain. The density of dry balsa wood ranges from 40 to 340 kg/m3, with a typical density around 160 kg/m3. Balsa is the softest wood ever measured using the Janka hardness test (22 to 167 lbf). The wood of the living tree has large cells that are filled with water. This gives the wood a spongy texture.  It also makes the wood of the living tree not much lighter than water and barely able to float.  For commercial production, the wood is kiln-dried for about two weeks, leaving the cells hollow and empty.  The large volume-to-surface ratio of the resulting thin-walled, empty cells gives the dried wood a large strength-to-weight ratio because the cells are mostly air.  Unlike naturally rotted wood, which soon disintegrates in the rainforests where balsa trees grow, the cell walls of kiln-seasoned balsa wood retain their strong structure of cellulose and lignin.

Because it is low in density but high in strength, balsa is a very popular material for light, stiff structures in model bridge tests, model buildings, and construction of model aircraft; all grades are usable for airworthy control line and radio-controlled aircraft varieties of the aeromodeling sports, with the lightest "contest grades" especially valuable for free-flight model aircraft. However, it is also valued as a component of full-sized light wooden aeroplanes, most notably the World War II de Havilland Mosquito.

Balsa is used to make wooden crankbaits for fishing, especially Rapala lures.

Sticks of dried balsa are useful as makeshift pens for calligraphy when commercial metal nibs of the desired width are not available.

Balsa wood is often used as a core material in composites; for example, the blades of many wind turbines are partly of balsa. In table tennis bats, a balsa layer is typically sandwiched between two pieces of thin plywood made from other species of wood. Balsa wood is also used in laminates together with glass-reinforced plastic (fiberglass) for making high-quality balsa surfboards and for the decks and topsides of many types of boats, especially pleasure craft less than 30 m in length. On a boat, the balsa core is usually end-grain balsa, which is much more resistant to compression than if the soft balsa wood were laid lengthwise.

Balsa is also used in the manufacture of "breakaway" wooden props such as tables and chairs that are designed to be broken as part of theatre, movie, and television productions.

The fifth and sixth generations of the Chevrolet Corvette had floor pans composed of balsa sandwiched between sheets of carbon-fiber-reinforced plastic.

Norwegian scientist and adventurer Thor Heyerdahl, convinced that early contact between the peoples of South America and Polynesia was possible, built the raft Kon Tiki from balsa logs, and upon it his crew and he sailed the Pacific Ocean from Peru to the Polynesian Tuamotu Archipelago in 1947. However, the Kon Tiki logs were not seasoned and owed much of their (rather slight) buoyancy to the fact that their sap was of lower density than sea water. This serendipitously may have saved the expedition, because it prevented the seawater from waterlogging the wood and sinking the raft.

Balsa wood is also a popular wood type used in the arts of whittling, and surfing. In the making of picture frames, balsa was often used in a baroque style because of the ease of shaping the design.

Gallery

See also 
 Tilia, another tree producing lightweight lumber (especially Tilia americana) 
 Paulownia

References

External links 
 

Bombacoideae
Malvaceae genera
Monotypic Malvales genera
Plants described in 1920
Trees of Mexico
Trees of Central America
Trees of Peru
Trees of South America
Trees of the Caribbean